Oxford University Department for Continuing Education (OUDCE) is a department within the University of Oxford that provides continuing education mainly for part-time and mature students.  It is located at Rewley House, Wellington Square, and at Ewert House, both in Oxford, England.

Some 15,000 students comprise the department, of which roughly 5,000 study for an Oxford University award or credit-bearing course. Other types of courses offered by the department include online courses, virtual classes, weekly classes, day and weekend courses, professional development and summer schools.

History
The 19th century saw an awakening social awareness to the needs of working-class people generally, and Oxford University signalled an educational responsibility to the general community by sending lecturers into towns and cities across Victorian England, bringing university education to a diverse adult audience. The University of Oxford was one of the founders, in the late 19th century, of the so-called 'extension' movement, wherein universities began to offer educational opportunities to adult learners outside their traditional student base. The University of Oxford Standing Committee of the Delegacy of Local Examinations was established in 1878. The first of the early "Oxford Extension Lectures" was delivered at the King Edward VI School in Birmingham, in September 1878 by the Reverend Arthur Johnson.  By 1893, Oxford University Extension Centres were bringing adult education to much of England and a few cities in Wales.

In 1927 the university purchased Rewley House on Wellington Square in Oxford as the permanent base of what was then known as the "University of Oxford Delegacy for Extra-Mural Studies", and which later was renamed as the Oxford University Department for Continuing Education. During the 1990s Kellogg College was co-located here.

See also 

 University of Cambridge Institute of Continuing Education

References

Organizations established in 1927
Continuing Education
Distance education institutions based in the United Kingdom
Education in Oxford
Kellogg College, Oxford
Continuing education